Alberto Marchiori (born 11 May 1993) is an Italian footballer who plays as a centre back.

In summer 2013 Marchiori left for Vicenza Calcio, with youngster Alessio Benedetti moved to opposite direction.

In July 2021, Alberto Marchiori signed with A.C. Este to play in Serie D, which is the fourth tier of the Italian league system.

References

External links

1993 births
Living people
People from Camposampiero
Italian footballers
Association football defenders
Serie A players
Genoa C.F.C. players
L.R. Vicenza players
Mantova 1911 players
Aurora Pro Patria 1919 players
Sportspeople from the Province of Padua
Footballers from Veneto